The British Academy Television Craft Award for Best Sound: Factual is one of the categories presented by the British Academy of Film and Television Arts (BAFTA) within the British Academy Television Craft Awards, the craft awards were established in 2000 with their own, separate ceremony as a way to spotlight technical achievements, without being overshadowed by the main production categories.

Before splitting into two categories for sound in 1992, Best Sound: Factual and Best Sound: Fiction, two categories were presented to recognize sound in television programming:
 From 1978 to 1991 Best Sound Supervisor was presented. 
 From 1978 to 1991 Best Film Sound was presented.

Winners and nominees

1990s

2000s

2010s

2020s

 Note: The series that don't have recipients on the tables had Sound team credited as recipients for the award or nomination.

See also
 Primetime Emmy Award for Outstanding Sound Editing for a Nonfiction or Reality Program (Single or Multi-Camera)
 Primetime Emmy Award for Outstanding Sound Mixing for a Nonfiction or Reality Program (Single or Multi-Camera)

References

External links
 

Sound: Factual